Anax indicus is a species of dragonfly in the family Aeshnidae. It is found in India, Nepal, Pakistan, Sri Lanka, and Thailand.

Description and habitat
It is a big dragonfly with blue eyes, pale green thorax and dark brown abdomen with bright yellowish-red markings on the sides. Its wings are transparent; but there are brown patches on the inner half of the hind-wings. Segment 1 and sides of segment 2 of the abdomen are pale green. The dorsum of segment 2 is blue with a narrow and broken transverse carina in the midst of the segment in addition to the broad terminal carinae. The dorsal side of segment 3 is blue with a black longitudinal mid-dorsal black line and sides are silvery white. The remaining segments are dark brown with yellowish-red dots on the sides. Segments 4 to 6 are with a pair of bright yellowish-red spots. On 7-8 these spots combine to form a continuous yellow band. Segments 9 to 10 are with a pair of large yellowish-red spots. Anal appendages are dark brown; the superiors have a triangular projection at the middle of their inner margin.

This dragonfly looks similar to Anax guttatus; but can be identifiable by contiguous yellow spots on the posterior abdomen segments (7-8). They are not connected in Anax guttatus.

Females is similar to the male. But the blue on the dorsum of segment 2 will be broken up into four by a narrow brown mid-dorsal carina and a transverse line lying midway to form a cross like mark. Anal appendages are very broad and shaped like lance head.

This species breeds in ponds, marshes and lakes.

See also
 List of odonates of India
 List of odonates of Sri Lanka

References

Aeshnidae
Insects described in 1942